The Liberation Tour was the fifth concert tour by American singer Christina Aguilera. The tour was launched in support of her eighth studio album, Liberation (2018), beginning on September 25, 2018 at the Hard Rock Event Center in Hollywood, Florida and concluding on November 13 of the same year at the Mahaffey Theater in St. Petersburg. The tour visited cities across the United States throughout 21 concerts. A series of scheduled shows in October including one in Orillia, Canada, were cancelled due to Aguilera's illness and safety concerns. After finishing her Back to Basics Tour in November 2008, Aguilera took a break from touring to focus on her family. The Liberation Tour was her first concert tour in 10 years. It was the first tour in support of Liberation. After its conclusion, Aguilera announced The X Tour in early 2019, which ran concurrently with her first concert residency Christina Aguilera: The Xperience in Las Vegas. The X Tour promoted the album through 18 concerts held in Europe and Mexico.

The Liberation Tour ranked at #132 on Pollstar's 2018 Year-End Top 200 North American Tours chart with a total gross of $8.7 million with an attendance of 77,854. Reviews for the tour were positive, being named one of the best 2018 live shows by Billboard. Critics complimented Aguilera's stage presence and vocals, with additional praise for the set list.

Background and development
Following the conclusion of the Back to Basics Tour in 2008, Aguilera scheduled a concert tour for her sixth studio album, Bionic (2010) for summer 2011. The tour was later cancelled, and Aguilera didn't tour for 10 years in order to focus on her family. After releasing Lotus (2012), Aguilera wouldn't release an album for another six years. Liberation was released on June 15, 2018 to critical acclaim. Before the release of the album, Aguilera announced The Liberation Tour in support of the album on May 9, 2018. American rapper Big Boi was announced as the tour's opening act. Aguilera asked fans on social media what songs would they like to be added to the set list and also teased some photos and videos from the behind the scenes of the tour visuals and rehearsals. To promote the tour, Aguilera made an appearance on Jimmy Kimmel Live! on September 12, 2018.

On September 23, two days prior to the start of the tour, a website titled "Liberate Your Love" was launched. Aguilera asked fans who were attending the show with a loved one to use the website to submit their love stories. While performing "Unless It's with You", a song about wanting to not during the encore, Aguilera would bring fans up on stage to share these stories and facilitate several marriage proposals. This would be followed by "Let There Be Love", which was labelled as a "reception" by Aguilera. The tour kicked off on September 25, 2018 in Hollywood, Florida. During the show, an unreleased song, seemingly titled "Wonderland", was played as an interlude in between songs.

The Liberation Tour concluded on November 13, 2018 after playing 21 shows across the United States. To promote the Liberation in other territories, Aguilera kicked off The X Tour the following year as a continuation.

Critical reception 

The tour received positive reviews from critics. Many praised Aguilera's vocals and stage presence and felt the show focused on the "hits" as well as the new material. Kori Hazel (303 Magazine) felt the show in Denver was too heavy on entertainment, with the singer recreating the many iterations of her career. He says: "So, as the setlist bounced between nostalgia and new tunes, many in the audience were left impressed, dancing and singing along throughout. Such is the case of extended absences—the artist is left to reach, hoping to connect with the expectations they left to either their benefit or their detriment." Lucas Villa (AXS) stated the concert in Las Vegas was a return to form for Aguilera, after taking a decade break from touring. He continues: "It took over 10 years, but the Liberation Tour was worth the wait. Seeing Aguilera being able to truly bask in what she's created over 19 years and being liberated from all the pressures and naysayers that have followed her throughout her career was beautiful, no matter what they say."

In Sugar Land, Jesse Sendejas, Jr (Houston Press) thought the show was a form of therapy for Aguilera's devoted fans, as she served her hits while showing her appreciation to the audience. He wrote: "The love fest continued through the night with Aguilera sometimes blocking songs together to recall specific albums, like a run from 2010's Bionic, or back-to-back songs from films she's been involved with over the years. If Aguilera is angling for a Vegas residency, the Liberation tour seems like a winning audition." For the Atlanta show, Melissa Ruggieri (The Atlanta Journal-Constitution) stated this comeback tour proved Aguilera is still a definitive figure within the pop landscape. She writes: "Though she's been playing much smaller venues than on her last arena tour, Aguilera didn't scrimp on visuals. [...] Aguilera's voice consistently retains the intensity of her chart-topping years, she's still a distinctive force."

The Liberation Tour was named one of the best 2018 live shows by Billboard.

Commercial performance 
The Liberation Tour ranked at #132 on Pollstar's 2018 Year-End Top 200 North American Tours chart with a total gross of $8.7 million with an attendance of 77,854.

Set list 

"Liberation" 
"Maria"
"How Did I Get Here" 
"Genie in a Bottle"
"Queen Is Back" 
"Dirrty" 
 "Sick of Sittin'"
 "Can't Hold Us Down"
"Right Moves" 
"Deserve"
 "Accelerate" 
 "Elastic Love" / "Woohoo" 
 "Bionic" 
 "Old Cartoons" 
 "Express" / "Lady Marmalade" 
"Back In The Day" 
 "Ain't No Other Man"
"Wonderland" 
 "Say Something" 
 "It's a Man's Man's Man's World"
 "Fighter"
"Dreamers" 
"Fall in Line"
 "Twice"
"Underwater" 
 "Beautiful"
Encore
"Unless It's with You"
 "Let There Be Love"

Shows

Cancelled shows

Personnel 

 Musical Director: Rob Lewis
 Photographer: Philip Macías
 Hair and Make-up: Etienne Ortega and Stephen Sollitto
 Stylist: Karen Clarkson
 Choreographer: Jeri Slaughter and Paul Morente, Ryan Ramirez
 Dancers: Charmain Baquiran, Gilbert Saldivar, Kai Lin, Monique Slaughter, Rebbi Rosie and Sophia Aguiar

Band 

 Bass guitar: Ethan Farmer
 Guitar: Michael Herring
 Drums: Stanley Randolph
 Keyboards: Rob Lewis
 Backing vocalist: Andrea-Latrelle Lanz, Colin Smith, Erika Jerry and Emi Secrest

See also 
 List of Christina Aguilera concerts
 List of Christina Aguilera concert tours

References 

2018 concert tours
Christina Aguilera concert tours
Concert tours of the United States